Vicente Sotto Memorial Medical Center (VSMMC) is a government-owned hospital in Cebu City, Philippines.

VSMMC is a general tertiary medical center teaching training medical facility owned by the Philippine Government. It aims to provide health care services that are available, affordable, accessible and acceptable to all regardless of social status.

Its operation started as early as 1911 known as Hospital del Sur and was formally established on April 11, 1913, and through Act 2725 that it granted its legal status on January 12, 1913. The name was then changed to Southern Islands Hospital with only 30 beds at its inception.

On June 1, 1992, RA 7588 was approved increasing the bed capacity of VSMMC from 150 beds to 400 beds. On June 22, 1998, Republic Act No. 8658 was approved increasing the bed capacity of VSMMC from 400 to 800 beds. On April 26, 2016, under Republic Act No. 10770 increasing the bed capacity of VSMMC from 800 to 1200 bed capacity and appropriating funds therefor.

Presently, the VSMMC is implementing its new direction with the development of Specialty and Sub-specialties under the different clinical departments. These Specialty and Subspecialties include the General Surgery, Neuro Surgery, Uro-Surgery, Internal Medicine, Obstetrics-Gynecology, Orthopedics, Otorhinolaryngology, Ophthalmology, Anesthesiology, Pathology, Psychiatry, Radiology, Plastic and Reconstructive Surgery, Emergency Medicine; Family Medicine and Pediatrics, Rehabilitation Medicine Department, Dental Services Unit and the National Voluntary Blood Services Program.

References

External links
Vicente Sotto Memorial Medical Center

Hospital buildings completed in 1911
Hospitals in the Philippines
Hospitals established in 1911
Buildings and structures in Cebu City
1911 establishments in the Philippines
20th-century architecture in the Philippines